Breudijk is a hamlet in the Dutch province of Utrecht. It is a part of the municipality of Woerden, and lies about 5 km northeast of Woerden.

The statistical district "Breudijk", which covers the hamlet and the surrounding countryside, has a population of around 190.

References

Populated places in Utrecht (province)
Woerden